Yibin (Sichuanese Pinyin: nyi2bin1;) is a prefecture-level city in the southeastern part of Sichuan province, China, located at the junction of the Min and Yangtze Rivers. Its population was 4,588,804 inhabitants, according to the 2020 census, of whom 2,158,312 lived in the built-up area comprising three urban districts.

History
Human habitation of Yibin dates back at least 4,000 years. Yibin was established as a county in the Han dynasty (206 BC − AD 220). Under the Ming and Qing, the town and its hinterland was known as Xuzhou Commandery   pXùzhōufǔ), which was variously romanized as Suifu, Suifoo, and Suchow. Its population around 1907 was estimated at 50,000.

Geography and climate

The city is located at the confluence of the Min and Yangtze Rivers.  Above Yibin, the Yangtze is also known as the Jinsha River.  Below Yibin, the Yangtze is known in Chinese as the Chang Jiang or "Long River."

As with the rest of the Sichuan Basin, Yibin has a monsoon-influenced humid subtropical climate (Köppen Cwa) with high humidity year-round; winters are short and mild while summers are long, hot, and humid. Despite its location in the Yangtze River valley, it is still  cooler than Chongqing, located further downstream, in its warmest months. Frost is uncommon and the frost-free period lasts 347 days. Rainfall is common year-round but is the greatest in July and August, with very little of it in the cooler months. With monthly percent possible sunshine ranging from 10% in December and January to 42% in August, the city receives only 1,018 hours of bright sunshine annually; Yibin has one of the lowest annual sunshine totals nationally, lower than even nearby Chengdu and Chongqing. Spring (March–April) tends to be sunnier and warmer in the day than autumn (October–November).

Administrative divisions

Economy
The city's industry focuses on electronics, food products, and power generation. It also produces paper, silk, and leather products. The surrounding region is rich in agricultural resources, growing rice, barley, oil seeds, sesame, and tea.

The largest employer in Yibin is Wuliangye Yibin, a company best known for Wuliangye, a brand of sorghum-based distilled spirits known as baijiu. The Wuliangye Group grew from a small company employing just 300 people in 1977 into a large company employing over 20,000 on a seven-square-kilometer plant.  According to an August 2005 article in a securities weekly, the Wuliangye Group is 72% state-owned and provides 70% of the revenues of Yibin City, a major regional center at the head of the Yangtze in southeastern Sichuan. In 2004 6,225 retired military worked for the company, out of a total work force of over 20,000. A third of top management positions are held by retired members of the military. Unsuccessful efforts to diversify its business, poor transparency and a murky ownership pictures are among the company's problems today.

Transportation
The region's natural waterways provide transportation links with the surrounding area, and Yibin is also connected to Chongqing and Chengdu by rail and express highway. Yibin's proximity to the Yunnan and Guizhou borders also means that transportation to the provinces is available by rail and by bus.

Yibin has three bridges over the Chang Jiang section of the Yangtze and ten bridges over the Jinsha.

Yibin Wuliangye Airport offers flights to Beijing, Guangzhou, Guiyang, Hangzhou, Kunming, Lhasa, Sanya, Shanghai,  Shenzhen, Xi'an, and Yichang.

Yibin opened the world's second Autonomous Rail Rapid Transit/"trackless tram" system in December 2019.

<noinclude>

Tourism
There are several hot springs near Yibin, plus many other tourist attractions. Such attractions include the Bamboo Sea in Changning County and the Xingwen Stone Forest. Yibin is also the confluence of the Min and Jinsha Rivers, which together form the Chang Jiang as the Yangtze River is known in Chinese, from Yibin to Shanghai. Cuiping Mountain Park, located west of the confluence of those two rivers, provides views of downtown Yibin.

Yibin in literature
 Dragonfly Eyes by Cao Wenxuan

Notes

References
 .
 .

External links
 Official city website
 Unofficial city briefing of Yibin
 Yibin City on bashu.net
 Yibin on chinaculture.org

 
Populated places on the Yangtze River
Prefecture-level divisions of Sichuan
Cities in Sichuan